CQT may refer to

Centre for Quantum Technologies in Singapore
Comparative Questions Test, used in polygraphs
Crewman Qualification Training for the U.S. Navy's Special Warfare Combatant-craft Crewmen
constant-Q transform, a short-time Fourier transform with logarithmic frequency resolution in signal processing
The Club of Queer Trades
Cryptocurrency token